Barrier is the surname of the following people:
Adrien Barrier (1891–?), French wrestler
Edgar Barrier (1907–1964), American actor
Ella D. Barrier (1852–1945), American educator 
 Eric B. (Louis Eric Barrier, born 1963), American hip hop musician
Ernestine Barrier (1908–1989), American actress, wife of Edgar
Fannie Barrier Williams (1855–1944), American educator and political and women's rights activist
James Barrier (1953–2008), American wrestling promoter
Jim Barrier (1940–2000), American alpine skier
Maurice Barrier (1932–2020), French actor and singer
 Michael Barrier (born 1940), American animation historian
Robert Barrier (1907–1955), French politician
 Smith Barrier (1961–1989), American sports journalist
Sylvain Barrier (born 1988), French motorcycle racer